Vilnius Girls' Gymnasium was a secondary education institution for girls in Vilnius while it was part of the Russian Empire. It was established in 1860 with the funding from the Office of the Institutions of Empress Maria and was viewed as a tool of Russification by the officials. Therefore, it was not popular and there were only 58 students in 1862. Officials considered reorganizing it into a three-year school. However, gradually the number of students increased and reached 831 in 1912. Most of the students were daughters of the nobility. The school was evacuated to Russia during World War I.

History

Establishment and first decade

In 1858, the Ministry of National Education started working on statutes that would allow establishing girls' secondary schools in the Russian Empire. Establishment of the gymnasiums was also sponsored by the Office of the Institutions of Empress Maria and the first school opened in April 1858 in Saint Petersburg. As a result of these developments, the Vilna Governor-General, started working on establishing girls' schools in the Governorate-General. However, he could not get local nobles and city residents agree to provide financial support to the proposed gymnasiums. The Office of the Institutions of Empress Maria agreed to finance schools in Vilnius, Kaunas, and Grodno and provide each with 3,000 Russian rubles. The schools were opened on 1 January 1860. Initially, Jewish girls were prohibited from attending the school, but this restriction was cancelled in October 1861. The first teachers were from the Institutes for Nobles and the curriculum was taken from district schools. 

The school taught in Russian and thus were not very popular. Despite some concessions (e.g. girls had twice the number of weekly Polish lessons than boys and their governess was a Roman Catholic and not Eastern Orthodox), the school in Vilnius had only 89 students in 1860 and 58 in 1862. Due to disappointing number of students, the Office of the Institutions of Empress Maria wanted to reorganize the gymnasiums into three-year schools. However, Nazimov convinced the authorities to keep them open as they were the only girls' schools that provided Russian education and thus facilitated Russification efforts. After the Uprising of 1863, new Governor-General Mikhail Muravyov-Vilensky decided to reorganize girls' gymnasiums along the same principles as boys' schools and eliminated Polish language as a subject from the curriculum. Due to Russification efforts and unlike elsewhere in the empire, parents and general public could not participate in shaping the curriculum, selecting teachers, or otherwise influencing the academics. Public input was accepted only on administrative and financial matters.

In 1867, once again, due to low enrollment, officials wanted to reorganize the gymnasium into a three-year school but it was not done to support Russification efforts.

Later years

When a number of Jewish students grew, local Jewish communities began petitioning the Office of the Institutions of Empress Maria to allow Judaism classes. The classes, taught in Russian, were allowed in 1870–1871. The classes were supposed to be financed by the parents but they complained of financial difficulties. The classes in Vilnius, Kaunas, and Grodno gymnasiums were made possible by a bequest of 2,400 rubles by Samuel Polyakov. The number of students grew necessitating separation of classes into two groups and rejection of applicants even if they successfully passed entrance exams. The gymnasium had 358 students in 1885 and 452 students in 1896. At the time, Jews were the largest group of students. However, after opening of separate Jewish schools, the number of Jewish students decreased even though the overall number of students continued to grow.

In 1873, the Mariinsky Higher Women's School was opened in Vilnius. It was a seven-year school with eighth year preparing the women for teaching jobs. After the Russian Revolution of 1905, private gymnasiums were allowed. As a result, three new private girls' gymnasiums were established in the Vilna Governorate.

Curriculum
Initially, compared to boys' gymnasiums, the girls' curriculum did not include Latin or Greek languages, physics or cosmography. Differences in the curriculums decreased in the 1870s. Overall, the curriculum focused on Russian language and literature with less attention devoted to math or sciences. Many teachers initially also taught at other schools, but gradually the gymnasium hired dedicated staff. By 1876, out of 12 teachers eight taught only at this school. Most frequently, it was math and science teachers who taught at multiple schools at once. Electives (such as French, German, Latin, drawing, pedagogics) allowed students to develop skill for the limited professional aspirations available to women at the time as teachers, nurses, or artists. Only Eastern Orthodox women could get teacher's positions in government schools; Roman Catholic women could only work in private schools.

Among other things, the petition asked the schools to admit everyone regardless of religion or nationality. The parents wanted the curriculum to include lessons on Lithuanian, Polish, and Hebrew languages as well as history and geography of these nations taught by a person from these nations. They also wanted religious lesson in student's native language. The parents wanted a say in designing curriculum and making library selections as well as voting rights in the school boards. They also asked to allow students to freely select their extracurricular activities, organize student activities, attend public events and lectures, and otherwise have control of their free time. Of these demands, officials allowed only Polish and Lithuanian language lessons. The Poles were more active and organized the Polish lessons in 1906; Lithuanian lessons started in March 1912.

Notable students
 Felicija Bortkevičienė, Lithuanian political activist and long-term publisher of Lietuvos ūkininkas and Lietuvos žinios
 Marija Piaseckaitė-Šlapelienė, Lithuanian bookstore owner and publisher
 Bronislava Šėmytė-Biržiškienė, wife of Mykolas Biržiška, signatory of the Act of Independence of Lithuania

References

Bibliography

Defunct schools in Vilnius
Girls' schools in Russia
1860 establishments in the Russian Empire
Educational institutions established in 1860
Gymnasiums in Vilnius